Order of the Motherland may refer to:

Belarus: see Orders, decorations, and medals of Belarus
Turkmenistan: Watan Order
Russia: the Order of Merit for the Motherland sometimes informally referred to as the "Order of the Motherland"